Nujuk (also Romanized as Nūjūk and Now Jūk) is a village in Lay Siyah Rural District, in the Central District of Nain County, Isfahan Province, Iran. At the 2006 census, its population was 39, in 14 families.

References 

Populated places in Nain County